The Nili Tower Arabic (برج اليعقوب) is a 57-floor tower in the Jumeirah Village in Dubai, United Arab Emirates. Construction of the Nili Office Tower was expected to be completed in 2019 but has yet to commence.

The building was built by a joint venture between Al Ahmadiah Contracting and Trading Co., from the UAE and Hip Hing Construction Co. Ltd. from China. Another hallmark project by this team is the Masdar City in Dubai, UAE.

See also 
 List of tallest buildings in Dubai
List of tallest buildings in the United Arab Emirates

External links
Emporis

Proposed skyscrapers in Dubai